The White Stag Leadership Development Program, founded in 1958, is a summer leadership training program for youth 10 1/2–18 led by two California-based non-profits that sponsor leadership development activities. The teen youth staff of the two programs develop and produce several week-long leadership summer training sessions every year for several hundred youth from Central and Northern California and a few youth from other states and countries. The outdoors program is based on hands-on learning methods to develop competencies.

The program was founded on the Monterey Peninsula, California, in 1958 by Dr. Béla H. Bánáthy, a Hungarian immigrant who taught at the language school. In the 21st century, there are two programs in California: one in Sacramento, sponsored by the White Stag Association, and one in Greenfield, sponsored by the White Stag Leadership Development Academy. Bánáthy drew from his youth experience at the 1933 World Jamboree in Gödöllő, Hungary; he named the program after the mythological white stag used as an emblem at the jamboree. Years later, in June 1951, Bánáthy met two more Hungarians teaching at the Army Language School. Like Banathy,  Joe Szentkiralyi and Paul Sujan  had attended the attended the 1933 World Jamboree, served in the armed forces, and escaped Hungary before Soviet occupation. They were initially assisted by a local American Scouter, Fran Peterson and later Maury Tripp.

As Monterey Bay Area Council Training Chairman, Bánáthy developed a program to train Scouts in leadership skills. He collaborated with research psychologist Paul Hood, who was leader of Task NCO (Non-Commissioned  Officer), a U.S. Army project that assessed the essential leadership skills of non-commissioned leaders. As part of his Master's thesis, Bánáthy identified eleven specific leadership competencies that he taught in the program's summer camp. The efforts of the four men, assisted by Maury Tripp, rapidly gained the attention of the National Council of the  Boy Scouts of America. They conducted extensive research that validated Bánáthy's leadership model and developed its own version for nationwide use. They introduced the leadership competencies during the 1970s into both the adult Wood Badge program and youth-focused National Youth Leadership Training. These two programs had originally focused primarily on teaching Scoutcraft skills and the Patrol Method. The change to teaching leadership was a marked cultural shift for how both adults and youth were trained in the skills of Scouting.

History 

Bánáthy and two of his co-founders have claimed their joint experiences at the Fourth World Scout Jamboree (1933)  in Gödöllő, Hungary, were highly influential in their lives. They drew from this in developing the White Stag program.

Origins in Hungary 

At the 1933 World Scout Jamboree, a 14-year-old Scout named Bela Bánáthy was kneeling by his campfire when three uniformed men rode up on horseback: Count Paul Teleki, the Chief Scout of Hungary and the Chief of Staff for the jamboree; General Kisbarnaki Ferenc Farkas, a general staff officer of the Royal Hungarian Army; and Baden-Powell, the British hero of the Boer War and Chief Scout of the World. The men introduced themselves to the Scout and inspected his camp. They complimented him on a job well done and rode on. Meeting the Chief Scout of Hungary and Boer War hero Robert Baden-Powell left a deep impression on Bánáthy. He decided he would become a military officer instead of a minister.

Bánáthy briefly met fellow scout Joseph Szentkiralyi. Hungarian Sea Scouter Paul Ferenc Sujan's camp was visited by Baden-Powell, who asked to taste some of his soup. American Maury Tripp attended the Jamboree from Saratoga, California. These four Scouts would later play instrumental roles in forming the White Stag program on the Monterey Peninsula. At the conclusion of the Jamboree, Baden-Powell gave a farewell speech in which he challenged the Scouts present to pursue the ideals represented by the White Stag.

This challenge and the myth of the White Stag inspired Bánáthy. During World War II, he was a junior officer in the Royal Hungarian Army. After being seriously wounded during combat in Russia, through the connections he made at the World Jamboree, he was invited by General Farkas to join the faculty of the Hungarian Royal Academy. While there he served on the National Council of the Hungarian Scout Association and became the voluntary national director for youth leadership development. Barely escaping Soviet capture (and likely execution) at the end of World War II, Bánáthy reached the United States in June 1951. He had been hired to teach at the Army Language School at Monterey, California. There he became reacquainted with Joe Szentkiralyi, whom he had met at the Fourth World Jamboree.

Joseph Szentkiralyi had also barely survived World War II. He and his family had previously lived in the United States in 1939, where Szentkiralyi worked in New York City. At the start of World War II, they were deported as enemy aliens to Hungary. Because he spoke English, Szentkiralyi was assigned to watch over the crew members of the first American B-17 bomber to crash land in Hungary. When the crew told him sensitive information, he was ordered to reveal the information to his superiors. Citing the Geneva Convention, he refused. The authorities prepared to court-martial him, and Szentkiralyi fled. During a time of frequent Allied aerial bombing raids, he hid in the upper floors of apartment buildings. During one bombing raid a  bomb crashed through and landed on the floor above him, but it did not explode. Szentkiralyi and his family later narrowly survived the siege of Budapest.

After the war ended, Szentkiralyi as a translator for the American Embassy in Budapest. However, this put him in a vulnerable position as the Communists hardened their grip on power. Because he had lived in the United States and spoke English, he knew he would fall under suspicion. People he knew began to disappear, including a friend who worked at the U.S. Embassy. Within a few days he found a note on his desk that read, "You are next." With American assistance, he immediately fled Hungary for Switzerland. He and his family returned to New York City for a few months, and Szentkiralyi applied for a position as a Hungarian instructor at the Army Language School. The Army hired him in the summer of 1948 and he founded theHungarian Department.

Starting in 1951, four men who had been Scouts at the 1933 World Jamboree encountered each other at Monterey. Joseph Szentkiralyi (who later Anglicized his name as St. Clair) hired Bánáthy. In 1956, Hungarian Paul Ferenc Sujan joined them at the School. In Monterey, they joined the Boy Scout movement, meeting F. Maurice Tripp.

Growth on the Monterey Peninsula 

When serving in the Hungarian Army, Bánáthy became interested in leadership development in boys and youth. In Monterey, he became Chairman of the Leadership Training Committee of the Monterey Bay Area Council. He gained support for his concept of a leadership camp for boys from the Council Executive and Executive Board.

Bánáthy informally recruited one patrol of boys, including his own sons, and took them to summer camp in 1957 to test his idea. John Chiorini, a 17-year-old Eagle Scout, was working on the waterfront. "Béla came through camp with a patrol of six or seven boys and commandeered me to teach a class on camp craft. He said he was trying out some new ideas with this patrol," Chiorini reported "Béla listened intently as I presented and then he came up after and gave me some tips on teaching. He was a mentor to me from that point on."

During the summer of 1958, Bánáthy recruited two patrols of boys to take part.  Chiorini was recruited to serve as senior patrol leader. At the beginning there was not much discussion of leadership competencies. Chiorini said, "White Stag was all about creating an environment in which youth led youth. At the time, Scouting was not necessarily a boy-led program. I remember it was very clear in Béla's mind what a boy-led Scouting program looked like. There was no question about who was in charge in White Stag. The boys were." Fran Peterson, a local Scouter who served on the National Engineering Service for the Boy Scouts of America, along with St. Clair, Sujan, and Tripp, helped Bánáthy develop the White Stag program. Some of them remained active with it into the 1970s.

Drawing from the 1933 World Jamboree, Bánáthy based the program symbol and its spirit on the white stag from Hungarian mythology. On June 8, 1959, the adults adopted this. "Lord Baden-Powell was my personal idol and I long felt a commitment to give back to Scouting what I had received," Bánáthy  said.

During August 1959, the first full-scale program was put on. Bánáthy served as Scoutmaster, Fran Petersen was Assistant Scoutmaster, along with eight other adult staff and 13 youth staff. The training troop consisted of 39 trainees from 24 troops. In the first two years of the program, emphasis was placed on training patrol leaders.

During the same year, Bánáthy studied leadership. He learned that the U.S. Army's Human Resources Research Organization (HumRRO) at the Presidio of Monterey was conducting research into the leadership characteristics of non-commissioned officers. Bánáthy contacted research psychologist Paul Hood, Task Leader of Task NCO (Non-commissioned Officer), and began a fruitful collaboration. A HumRRO publication titled, A Guide for the Infantry Squad Leader – What the Beginning Squad Leader Should Know About Human Relations defined a core set of leadership competencies. Bánáthy found Hood's research useful, identifying characteristics of leadership. With Hood's active encouragement, he decided to emphasize development of those skills in the White Stag program.

In 1960, the adult staff announced that they would expand the program to offer an additional phase of leadership development for boys 14 – 17 years old, to train "junior trainers and impart leadership skills." This phase was christened Troop Leadership Development.

National Council takes notice 

 With the interest and support of the Monterey Bay Area Council executive staff and board, the program was continually tested and improved. Two men with connections on the National Council, Fran Peterson (a member of the National Council's Engineering Service) and F. Maurice Tripp (a research scientist and member of the National Boy Scout Training Committee), brought the White Stag program to the National Council's attention. In 1962, Tripp formed and chaired an advisory board of educators, psychologists, management specialists, and members of the Scout professional staff.

During 1962 – 63, Bánáthy focused his research, using it as the basis of his Master's Thesis at San Jose State University. The Monterey Bay Area Council published Bánáthy's abbreviated version entitled A Design for Leadership Development in Scouting. Responding to widespread interest, Dr. Tripp gave a talk in 1963 at the Fifty-third Annual Meeting of the National Council of the Boy Scouts of America on Development of Leadership in Boy Leaders of Boys. In August 1963, a patrol of Scouts from the San Mateo County Council and a few boys from the Circle Ten Council in Dallas attended White Stag summer camp at Camp Pico Blanco. The program was observed and evaluated by Ken Wells (national director of Research) and John Larson (staff researcher). Wells had a long history with Wood Badge, beginning as a participant in the second United States Wood Badge course in 1948. They were impressed by the program.

At the end of the August 1964 summer camp, Bánáthy and Peterson announced that White Stag would begin in 1965 to offer a third phase of leadership development for boys age 11 – 13, called "Patrol Member Development." This enabled all boys 11 – 17 years old to learn leadership skills appropriate to their maturity. If they stayed with scouting, they had the chance to advance in other phases of development.

World Scouting publishes paper 

In 1969, the World Organization of the Scout Movement published Bánáthy's paper titled Leadership Development: World Scouting Reference Paper No. 1. Describing the results of BSA's research and testing of the leadership program, it was presented at the World Scoutings Conference in Helsinki. Bánáthy was appointed to the Interamerican Scout Committee and guided their national training teams at three Interamerican 'Train the Trainer' events in Mexico, Costa Rica, and Venezuela.

Adapted for use in U.S. Wood Badge 

In January 1967, John Larson began work with Bánáthy and Bob Perin to write a new Wood Badge staff guide focusing on leadership. Ken Wells and Perin had participated in the second United States Wood Badge course in 1948. Despite their long experience with Wood Badge, they saw the benefit of adding leadership skills development to its requirements. William "Green Bar" Hillcourt, Scoutmaster of the first U.S. Wood Badge course in 1948, felt very strongly that the traditional teaching of Scoutcraft skills should be retained. Hillcourt had recently formally retired, but his opinion held considerable weight. Chief Scout Joseph Brunton approved the changes.

Later that year, the National BSA began to evaluate the revised Wood Badge program using leadership competencies . On June 17, 1967, the first experimental Wood Badge course was offered at Philmont. One month later, the Circle Ten Council in Dallas presented its first new Wood Badge course. In September 1967, six councils were approved to pilot-test the new Wood Badge program in 1968: Monterey Bay Area Council, Piedmont Council, Middle Tennessee, Del-Mar-Va, and Hiawatha (formerly Onondago) and Circle Ten Council.
Among these was an experimental Wood Badge course in Monterey in 1968. Bánáthy was Course Director, Joe St. Clair served as Scoutmaster, and Fran Petersen was senior patrol leader. John Larson, National Director of Education, was also present. All attendees were asked to bring their entire troop to a single week of summer camp, allowing the Wood Badge staff to use the summer camp as an application for Wood Badge.

Modified for use in junior leader training 

Pilot-testing and experimentation continued for three more years. An experimental junior leader training program was begun in 1969. It was later known as Troop Leader Development; the final Troop Leadership Development Staff Guide, written by John W. Larson, credited White Stag with its origins.

Recent history 

Through the early 1970s, the White Stag program presented the Monterey Bay Area Council's official junior leader training program; this was revived from 1994 to 2004. In 1975, Bill Roberts, the Phase III Director, invited the first Explorer girls age 14 – 18 to take part in the program and adult women to serve on adult staff. This was the first co-educational leadership development program in the BSA. The next year White Stag invited girls age 11 – 13 to participate as well. The program was evaluated in 1978 by a staff member from the Western Region of the BSA. He wrote:

 White Stag Association incorporated

At the same time, the Monterey Bay Area Council decided to replace the White Stag program with the Troop Leader Development program. The adult volunteer leaders of White Stag, informally known as the White Stag Steering Committee, incorporated in 1982 as the non-profit foundation White Stag Association; it continued to sponsor the program.

For two years, the Association rented Skylark Ranch Resident Camp in the Santa Cruz Mountains from the Girl Scouts of Santa Clara County. Over the next few years, the Association moved the summer program to San Mateo County Council's Camp Cutter in the Santa Cruz Mountains, and later, at different times, to Marin Council's Camp Marin-Sierra and Yosemite Council's Camp Mensinger in the California Sierra Nevada. They began to attract most youth attendees from the San Francisco Bay Area. In 2014, the Association secured use of Camp Robert L. Cole in the Tahoe National Forest near Cisco Grove, California.

 White Stag Academy formed

When the Monterey Bay Area Council's Junior Leader Training Chairman offered in 1994 to run the Council's junior leader training program using the White Stag methods, the Council Executive agreed. White Stag adult alumni of the now San Francisco Bay Area-based program who lived in the Monterey Peninsula area recruited a youth staff who planned and presented the White Stag program at Camp Pico Blanco in 1994. This Monterey-based program continued to present the council's junior leader training program until 2005. That year a new Council Executive decided to adopt the current BSA National Youth Leadership Training (NYLT) program.

The adult leadership of the Monterey White Stag group incorporated in 2005 as the non-profit charity White Stag Leadership Development Academy, Inc. to support the program. Until 2015, they based the summer camp program at camps Cutter and Lindblad in the Santa Cruz Mountains, Camp Tamarancho in Marin County, and a custom-built camp in Arroyo Seco on private land. In August 2015, the Academy purchased  for $462,000, in Carmel Valley and renamed the site, formerly a gun club, "Piney Creek Camp."

 Girl Scout spin-off

During 2004, some leaders of the White Stag Academy organized a comparable program for the Girl Scouts of California's Central Coast. The program teaches the eleven leadership skills used by White Stag. It was held at Cutter Scout Reservation for two years and is currently held at Boulder Creek Scout Reservation in the Santa Cruz Mountains. The Girl Scouts assumed leadership of the program after 2006 and renamed it Camp Artemis, after the Greek goddess who protects young girls, animals, and the natural environment. The Youth Staff are referred to as members of ALTA (Artemis Leadership Training Adventure). They have continued to run Camp Artemis as a resident camp for girls 11 – 17 each summer.

 Summer camp programs

Both the organization in Central California and the group in Northern California continue to develop and present summer camps for youth by youth, led by a corps of volunteer adults. The program will observe its 60th anniversary in 2018. Participation in the Monterey-based group has continued to increase each year, to 420 participants in 2015, including 33 youth from Hong Kong, Taiwan, and mainland China, up from 70 in 2006. The group sponsored by the White Stag Association has attracted between 40 and 83 campers from 2010 to 2014. The two programs have operated continuously since the program's founding entirely on a voluntary basis, with an estimated 21,000 youth having attended its camps.

Core tenets

Youth ready to learn 

In his master's thesis, Bánáthy established his reasoning for focusing on developing leadership skills in youth rather than adults. He wrote that adults in leadership development experiences often have "deeply and rigidly established patterns which are difficult to change." He felt leadership development needs to start early in life, when an opportunity exists to give individuals long-term exposure to leadership behavior. Bánáthy formulated the White Stag program to address the needs of youth from 11 to 17 years of age. He did this when defining leadership as a learnable skill was still in its infancy.

Youth need leadership development 

A number of researchers have identified needs of youth for specific kinds of formative experiences. In one study,  Ferber, Pittman, and Marshall described five developmental priorities for youth. These were learning (developing positive basic and applied academic attitudes, skills, and behaviors), thriving (developing physically healthy attitudes, skills, and behaviors), connecting (developing positive social attitudes, skills, and behaviors), working (developing positive vocational attitudes, skills, and behaviors), and leading (developing positive civic attitudes, skills, and behaviors).

Educators report that successful programs use "positive and sustained relations with a caring adult, mentoring in life skills and opportunities to use newly learned skills." Other elements identified for training of youth are strong relationships with adults; training in mediation, conflict resolution, team dynamics, and project management; new roles and responsibilities based on experiences and resources that provide opportunity for growth, teamwork and peer networking; and opportunities to practice communication, negotiation, and refusal skills.

Youth-led program 

The White Stag Leadership Development Program's methods address all of the areas the studies identified. Mentored and coached by adults, the youth staff develop, plan and implement the week-long summer camp programs. They develop skills in research, writing, planning, and evaluation. Using the outdoors, they practice learning activities, games, and outdoor skills required to live in a camping environment. They learn to get along with and other counsel youth from different backgrounds. They study eleven specific skills of leadership and practice presenting them to one another before summer camp, when they present these learning sessions to the participants. The youth, led and mentored by adults, work together with other youth they have never met, forming new relationships and learning to connect and cooperate. They learn basic group membership skills required in work life, like communication and planning, and plan and implement their leadership skills in their home community. They learn and practice problem-solving and counseling skills, how groups form and grow, and planning skills. They learn and rehearse various kinds of communications skills, how to represent their group—both with and without the group's input—and how to work effectively with others.

Leadership competencies 

In his research for his master's thesis, Bánáthy identified 80 characteristics of leadership. He summarized them as 11 leadership competencies, which he proposed be taught in a systematic process, using six developmental levels tailored to the various needs of youth at different stages. The White Stag leadership competencies are organized into three groups, taught in relation to individual and group readiness.

Four-stage learning approach 

The group writes down both general goals and very specific, measurable objectives each year that describe leadership in behavioral terms. When engaging learners in leadership development learning activities, the youth staff implement a four-phase approach called Manager of Learning.

The first step requires the participant to practice the skill without preparation. The simulation is made as real and practical as possible within the limitations of the training environment. Both the participant and the instructor gain through this Guided Discovery an assessment of the learner's current knowledge, skills, attitudes relevant to the learning task.

The second step is a Teach/Learn session where the instructor begins to present information based on what the participants don't already know. This is usually prefixed with a written statement describing in behavioral terms the objectives that the participant will complete during the session. The instructor may utilize more advanced members to help less skilled members. The instructor often tries to elicit information from the participants' experience by asking questions.

Once the Teach/Learn is complete, the third step allows participants an opportunity in an Application to practice their newly acquired skills. This may or may not be an experience like the Guided Discovery.

The final step is an Evaluation discussion, during which the participants not only self-assess whether they achieved the stated learning objectives, but to give feedback to the instructor about their success in presenting the information.

Developing group members 

The first three competencies are essential to forming the group's ability to organize itself and become ready for action.

Getting and Giving Information teaches participants about different types of communication and how communication helps establish the group. They learn how to get, store, and retrieve information. Individuals practice communicating to both help get the job done and keep the group together.

Understanding Group Needs and Characteristics helps individuals build group morale and unity. They learn about values, norms, needs, and characteristics.

Knowing and Understanding Group Resources helps learners to use resources to improve group togetherness, to learn about different kinds of resources, and how as a leader can use the diversity of group members' skills and abilities to help the group succeed. They learn about how resources affect getting the job done and keeping the group together.

Growing group capability 

The second group of leadership competencies help the group to develop and implement a plan.

Controlling the Group helps individuals to learn how their behavior affects others. Individuals learn the difference between external control of the group and personal control of their own behavior. They learn that controlling the group is something that everyone in the group contributes to. They learn about different techniques to influence group success. They gain skills in balancing the group's versus the individual's needs.

Counseling helps individuals to define key counseling ideas, learn simple counseling methods, and identify when simple counseling is appropriate.

Setting the  Example helps participants identify what it means to set a good example, why setting an example is important, and describe ways a leader can set a good example.

Planning provides learners a chance to learn about problem-solving and its importance to a leader. They learn problem-solving and planning methods and how planning contributes to accomplishing the task and to group success.

Evaluation enables the learner to use evaluation improve group focus and get the job done. They learn to balance getting the job done and helping the group, and learn to continually assess their level of success.

Accomplish the task 

The last group of leadership competencies helps individuals to grow the organization.

Sharing Leadership helps participants learn that leadership is something that is shared by all group members depending on the situation and group member's abilities. They learn about what kinds of things affect the leader and the group, and what style of leadership is appropriate. They learn to select a style of leadership based on the job and the group situation.

Representing the Group is a way for participants to learn about how groups communicate and how to represent one group to another. They learn how to accurately represent their group to another.

Manager of Learning is a four-step technique for instructing others. Participants learn how to develop effective learning techniques.  for effectively communicating information; emphasize the learner in the learning process.

The program

Values 

The program has defined a set of values that govern how the program is implemented.

One of the most important is outdoor learning. Program leaders believe that the outdoors environment provides a context for learning that is physically demanding and entirely different from that experienced every day at home and in school. The outdoors stimulates new ways of thinking and approaching both task- and group-related problems. As participants learn they can exceed what they perceive to be their physical limits, they find their mental capacity also grows. White Stag uses the physical environment to tire the individual and open their minds to new ways of thinking. The program does nothing indoors that can be done outdoors, and encourages physical fitness through outdoor activities. Using the outdoors avoids the negative association of a standard classroom environment.

In addition, the program utilizes outdoor camping skills to provide opportunities to practice leadership skills. One of the first challenges a leader-in-training  faces is to plan how to set up of their camp and cook their meals. They learn how to analyze the task, how to plan the task and organize the group, how to use all of the groups' resources, how to implement their plan, and how to evaluate and correct.

The program teaches participants to cultivate an evaluation attitude, or a predisposition to continually seek improvement. Growth as a leader is dependent on his ability to assess his current skill level and to accept the necessity for change. The leader can only attain his goals if he continuously works to analyze his movement towards achieving his goals and objectives.

White Stag uses the patrol method to effectively include all members. Baden-Powell wrote "[t]he Patrol System is the one essential feature in which Scout training differs from that of all other organizations, and where the System is properly applied, it is absolutely bound to bring success. It cannot help itself! The formation of the boys into Patrols or from six to eight and training them as separate units each under its own responsible leader is the key to a good Troop."

One of the most important values is a focus on hands-on learning. The program emphasizes use of experiential learning activities in the context of outdoor education. These help participants retain what they learn about leadership generally and the eleven leadership competencies specifically. For example, participant teams can be challenged to build foot bridges, complete a hike, build a Tyrolean Traverse, cook a meal, or other practical challenges.

Always seeking to engage individuals both physically and mentally, the program uses the hurdle method. The hurdle method teaches individuals how to nimbly respond situation for which they have not specifically prepared themselves. The manager of learning prepared and present unexpected tasks or challenges to the leader and the group which they must organize themselves to find a solution or to complete a task. The hurdle method is closely linked to hands-on learning.

The program believes leadership can be taught using a direct approach, not by osmosis or example alone. In early leadership development programs,  learning about leadership was not specifically defined with qualified objectives. Learning about leadership was a by-product of other learning activities. The White Stag Method challenges these indirect methods and focuses the participant's experience using a direct approach. The White Stag program defines leadership behaviors in specific terms as eleven leadership competencies.

Youth spend too much time learning what their teachers think is important, irrelevant from what the youth may already know. The manager of learning value allows the youth to learn and practice his skills in situations simulating real life. The Manager of Learning methodology first exposes the learner to a situation to help both the learner and the leader assess his current state of knowledge. This causes the learner to internalize a need to improve his knowledge or skills. This is followed by a period of teaching or exposure during which the participant improves from their base-line knowledge. The participant then gets a chance to apply what he has learned, and lastly, evaluates his performance improvement.

The program believes that learning never stops and embraces this as the infinity principle.  According to Bánáthy, leadership behavior cannot be developed "during a few weeks, not even during several months," but must be ongoing.

It takes months for individuals to gain proficiency in leadership skills. "The White Stag continues to leap on—upward and forward—in a never-ending journey that leads the joyous followers to the promised land. For us who wear the badge of the White Stag, the White Stag journey symbolizes the idea of becoming the best we can." The program borrowed words from Baden-Powell's Jamboree farewell, "Forward, Upward, Onward," to define leadership:

Individuals are taught to believe that difficult situations are opportunities for growth that must be overcome. Thus, leadership development cannot take place during a single training course. It is a continuous sequence of sequential, structured learning and experience-building opportunities. The program subscribes to the belief that when an individual embraces the infinite challenge to change, he is engaged in the never-ending process of becoming a leader. "The infinity principle of growth in leadership is what the White Stag symbolizes in this leadership development process."

Avoiding stereotypes and labeling based on personal dress, the program uses polo shirts, t-shirts, and other articles of clothing like neckerchiefs as uniforms. Participants uniforms display the White Stag logo, which is a visible reminder of the program's founding vision articulated by Baden-Powell at the conclusion of the 1933 World Jamboree. The uniform reminds the individual wearing it of their commitment to the program's values. It instills self-esteem in the person and pride in the program. It eliminates class and socio-economic distinctions. Wearing a uniform improves member's behavior and lessens the impact on a person's personal wardrobe.

Phases and levels 

Based on Béla Bánáthy's original work, the program is still organized into three phases, each consisting of a candidate, youth staff, and an adult staff level. This structure allows youth to develop their leadership skills over several years through gradually more intense and more advanced levels of instruction. Each level is tailored to the needs of youth at specific ages and maturity levels.

The youth staff develop each summer camp's program during the preceding nine months in a series of leadership development training and planning events. They are ultimately responsible for the entire leadership program's content.

Advanced Leadership Development 

In 2017, White Stag Monterey started a new exclusive program called Advanced Leadership Development. The program focuses on the real world applications of the leadership competencies in addition to delving deeper into the theory of the skills taught in the lower levels.

ALD is an extension of the teachings of the earlier phases. To be accepted into the program, applicants must be between the ages of 16 and 21 and have completed Troop Leadership Development, making it the only part of the White Stag program with a mandatory prerequisite. In addition, they must be interviewed by one of the ALD staff members.

Because of the small number of candidates in ALD, instead of multiple candidates being assigned a single patrol counselor or patrol leader, each individual candidate is assigned a staff member as a "buddy", who they work with one-on-one throughout the week.

Aims 

The program has four primary aims  that are closely aligned with the aims of the Boy Scouts of America with the addition of leadership development. The program focuses on character development, which it defines as encouraging people to do what is right, no matter what, and to serve themselves and others. Its second aim is personal fitness, and in its programs it encourages individuals to accept physical and mental challenges, to surpass their own expectations, expand their knowledge, skills and abilities, and strive for continuous personal improvement. Their third aim is  citizenship training, in which it helps individuals to develop a positive attitude, influence those around them, join in and shape their community. The paramount aim however is leadership development, in which it inspires individuals to engage life as an ongoing adventure,  to challenge themselves, and to lead others to pursue excellence.

Symbolism and mythology 

Differentiating White Stag from any other leadership program for youth is its spirit and traditions, including campfires, ceremonies, skits, yells, cheers, and emblems, all of which give it a distinctive character. These are used to communicate an ethic of always striving for self-improvement and personal achievement, and values that include characteristics of servant leadership, compassion, enthusiasm, kindness, and selflessness.

The symbolism of the White Stag is described in a story telling the White Stag legend. The legend borrows from the Fourth World Jamboree held in  Hungary, which in turn was inspired by Hungarian mythology of the white stag. The White Stag Legend is used to inspire in the participants a desire for reflection, continuous self-improvement, and pursuit of higher aims and goals. Other traditions include woggles, waist ropes, staves, berets, and patrol names. The legend tells a version of a legend honoring Hunor and Magyar, who led their people in pursuit a mythical White Stag, following it over impassable trails to a new home. Through this story and  other ceremonies, the program challenges individuals to continually strive "onward and upward" and "overcome challenges, continuously evaluate, focus on learning, and always strive to improve".

Training locations 

The White Stag program is currently offered by two unrelated non-profit groups in Northern and Central California. White Stag Sierra,in northern California, the non-profit White Stag Association sponsors three Venturing crews, a Learning for Life group, and a Boy Scout troop that plan and produce the summer training program in Northern California, in the past at Camp John Mensinger, Camp Wolfeboro, and since 2014 at Camp Robert L. Cole.

White Stag Monterey, in central California, the non-profit White Stag Leadership Development Academy sponsors a Venturing crew, in the Silicon Valley Monterey Bay Council. These youth plan and put on a program each summer in Central California. In 2009 they offered for the first time training sessions, one at Camp Tamarancho in Marin County in Northern California, and the second at Camp Lindblad in the Santa Cruz Mountains. They have continued to offer two training sessions in the summer and in 2012 based the program at a site in the Santa Lucia Range near Arroyo Seco. Youth staff participants are registered as members of the Boy Scouts or Venturing programs in the Silicon Valley Monterey Bay Council and the Alameda Council. In 2015, the Academy purchased a former gun club totalling 160 acres near Greenfield for $475,240. The following year they bought adjacent property for an additional $249,000. According to the 2019 Form 990, they owe $696,500 on the two properties, total revenue of $316,956, and expenses totalling $176,007.

Both programs adhere to the Youth Protection Standards of the Boy Scouts of America, including background checks of all adult leaders. A few participants have traveled from France, China, Martinique, and Taiwan.

Financial support 

The White Stag program is implemented by two 501(c)3 non-profits. The White Stag Leadership Development Academy, Inc. is located on the Monterey Peninsula and the White Stag Association is located in the Sacramento region. Both are financially self-supporting. The programs are administered and managed by adult volunteers. All participants, including youth and adult staff, pay fees to participate. Fees for participants attending the week-long summer camp are US$365–$449 in 2019. Candidate attendees to White Stag Sierra pay up to $390, while the Association in Monterey charges a maximum of $449. , adult and youth staff volunteers paid about US$400 in fees over the course of a year of staff development.

Awards and recognition 

Since 1960, the program has recognized one or two youth and adults each year by presenting them with a Silver Stag award. The device, a miniature solid sterling silver stag on a chain or medallion, recognizes the individual's outstanding "contributions and qualities of leadership, spirit and service to the program." One youth staff member from each phase is selected as the outstanding youth staff member. Each graduating participant received a neckerchief unique to each phase that is to be worn only at White Stag functions. Participants may also be recognized with other awards that vary from year to year.

Other programs that used the White Stag name 

In 1967, Rex Hatch returned to the  Crossroads of America Council after attending a pilot test of the JLT program at Philmont. He founded in 1972 a junior leader training program, previously known  as Silver Bars, which was initially based on the White Stag program's principles. It was later modified to follow the National Youth Leadership Training Course syllabus. The Hoosier Trails Council in Bloomington, Indiana produced a "National Youth Leadership Training" program based on the national syllabus that was nicknamed "White Stag NYLT" until 2011. On the east coast, the Narragansett Council in Rhode Island nicknamed their national NYLT program as "White Stag NYLT" until 2011.

These programs are produced by the local councils. They present the standardized, nationally mandated National Youth Leadership Training program. The non-profit White Stag Academy in Monterey, California sponsors Venture Crew 122, which develops and produces a summer camp program independent of the  Boy Scout of America's nationally mandated National Youth Leadership Training.

Notes

References 

Outdoor education organizations
Alternative education
Experiential learning
Scouting
Youth organizations based in California
Organizations established in 1958
Leadership training of the Boy Scouts of America
Monterey, California
Summer camps in California
1958 establishments in California